Sam Mitchinson (born 26 September 1992) is a left footed Australian football (soccer) player who currently plays for Gwelup Croatia.

Club career

Perth Glory
In 2009, he signed a youth contract with A-League club Perth Glory.  He made his professional debut in the 2011-12 A-League season on 25 March 2012 in a round 27 match against Melbourne Victory at the nib Stadium. After the conclusion of the 2011–12 A-League season he left Perth and joined Oakleigh Cannons where he made 9 league appearances.

Melbourne Heart
On 2 November he made his A-league debut for Melbourne Heart in Round 5 against Western Sydney at Parramatta Stadium.

References

1992 births
Living people
Sportspeople from Walsall
Australian soccer players
Perth Glory FC players
Melbourne City FC players
A-League Men players
Association football defenders